Lucy Ann Beaumont is a British actress, writer, and stand-up comedian from Kingston upon Hull, East Yorkshire. Her performance is based largely on anecdotes about Hull and the wider Northern England region. She won the BBC Radio New Comedy Award in 2012 and was a finalist on So You Think You're Funny in 2011. Her 2014 debut show at the Edinburgh Festival, We Can Twerk it Out,  was nominated for that year's Best Newcomer Award.

Early life
Born prematurely while her parents were on holiday in Truro, Cornwall, Beaumont grew up with a single mother in the Spring Bank area of Hull and later lived in the town of Hessle, near Hull. Her mother is the playwright Gill Adams, who won the Fringe First Award for best new play in 1997 at the Edinburgh Festival. She attended Hessle High School, before going on to Wyke Sixth Form College. Beaumont worked at the meat counter of Asda on Hessle Road, West Hull, and later went on to the University of Hull, graduating with a degree in drama studies. 

After university, she briefly worked as a teaching assistant. When one of her first acting jobs after university fell through, Beaumont took on a job as a cleaner at the university to make a living, leading her to joke later that she was probably the only person with both a BA and an NVQ from the University of Hull.

Career
Beaumont had a brief acting career, touring with Hull Truck Theatre, York Theatre Royal and West Yorkshire Playhouse. She switched to comedy after she had initially tried it in an attempt to conquer stage fright and was inspired by her sitcom-like life in Hull. In 2009, she took part in the BBC's Northern Laughs programme, where she was mentored by Jeremy Dyson.

Beaumont is known for her observational comedy about her home city of Hull including the local dialect and food such as patties and chip spice. Her on-stage persona delivers deadpan anecdotes and has been described as "ditzily naïve".

Her first gig was for the 2011 So You Think You're Funny competition, for which she would later become a finalist.

She co-wrote and starred in the radio sitcom To Hull and Back, starring fellow Hull actor Maureen Lipman. The sitcom started with a pilot on BBC Radio 2 in 2014, and a full series was ordered. Three series of the show were broadcast between 2015 and 2018. She wrote an article in The Guardian about Hull in 2015 as it prepared to be UK City of Culture. In 2017, Beaumont presented the BBC Two documentary Welcome to Hull – City of Culture 2017. Beaumont is also the narrator in the 2018 BBC documentary Hull's Headscarf Heroes about Lillian Bilocca and the 1968 Triple Trawler Disaster. Beaumont said that the story moved her especially because her grandparents and their families were "born and bred in the fishing community on [Hull's] Hessle Road."

In 2013, Beaumont won the Chortle Award for Best Newcomer and appeared on BBC Three's Live at the Electric. She presented her show We Can Twerk it Out at the Edinburgh Festival Fringe in 2014 nominated for that year's Best Newcomer Award.

She was a guest on Dave's Alan Davies: As Yet Untitled in 2015 and on the BBC Two panel quiz show QI in 2016. She has been a regular guest on Dave panel show Jon Richardson: Ultimate Worrier, hosted by her husband Jon Richardson, in 2018 and 2019.

In 2019, Beaumont returned to the Edinburgh Festival with her show Space Mam, which she also took on tour in the UK.

Beaumont was team captain for the University of Hull team on BBC Two's 2019 Christmas University Challenge. Although they won their first round, the score was insufficient to advance to the semi-finals. Beaumont also made her first appearance on 8 Out of 10 Cats Does Countdown alongside her husband Jon Richardson, Sean Lock, and Bob Mortimer for the 2019 Christmas special.

A comedy series, Meet the Richardsons, written by Beaumont and Tim Reid was broadcast on Dave from February 2020; it is a documentary-style sitcom with Beaumont and Richardson playing exaggerated versions of themselves. A two-part Christmas Special aired from the 9th December 2020 and a second series followed in April 2021.  The third series began broadcasting in March 2022.

In 2021, Channel 4 commissioned a comedy series called Hullraisers from Beaumont, which is to be a six-part series co-written with Anne-Marie O'Connor. Beaumont also released her first book Drinking Custard: Diary Of A Confused Mum, which details her struggles with her pregnancy and motherhood.

In 2022, Beaumont appeared in an episode of the revival series of The Weakest Link, hosted by Romesh Ranganathan. She was voted out in round 3.

Charity work
In 2019, Beaumont set up the project "Backpack Buddies" in Hull to help children in need of meals during the school holidays. To raise funds for the project, Beaumont staged the HULLarity comedy gala in June 2019.

Beaumont supports several UK charities, including Hull Children's University, Mothershare and the Great Laugh campaign.

Personal life
Beaumont married comedian Jon Richardson in April 2015 after being match-made together by fellow comedian Roisin Conaty. They have a daughter, Elsie Louise, born via an emergency caesarean section, in September 2016.

Works

References

External links

Backpack Buddies

Living people
Comedians from Yorkshire
English stand-up comedians
English women comedians
Alumni of the University of Hull
People from Hessle
People from Kingston upon Hull
People from Truro
Year of birth missing (living people)